Nathan Michael Elasi (born 18 November 1989 in Sydney) is an Australian footballer who plays for Sutherland Sharks FC in the NSW National Premier Leagues Mens 1.

Club career
Elasi was named Golden Boot winner in the Football NSW Grade 20 league with Marconi Stallions in their 2006–2007 season.

Melbourne Victory
He was signed by Melbourne Victory in January 2008, as a recruit for Victory's 2008 AFC Champions League campaign, primarily as a back-up for first choice strikers, Archie Thompson and Danny Allsopp. Originally recommended to Ernie Merrick by fellow Young Socceroos player Sebastian Ryall, Elasi had since impressed in club training with his pace, positioning and his ability to use his body.

Bonnyrigg White Eagles
He had a trial with new club Melbourne Heart but turned down their contract offer due to them being a rival of his old club Victory. Afterwards, Elasi joined the NSW Premier League team in April 2010 setting up the final goal in Bonnyrigg's 4–0 victory over the Bankstown City Lions on debut.

APIA Leichhardt Tigers
Elasi signed for NSW NPL1 club APIA Leichhardt Tigres for their 2015 campaign.

Honours 
Australia
 International Cor Groenewegen Tournament (U-20): 2009
 AFF U19 Youth Championship: 2008

Melbourne Victory FC
 A-League Championship: 2008–09
 A-League Premiership: 2008–09

References

External links
 Melbourne Victory profile
 FFA – Young Socceroos profile

1989 births
Living people
Soccer players from Sydney
Melbourne Victory FC players
A-League Men players
Sutherland Sharks FC players
National Premier Leagues players
Association football forwards
Bonnyrigg White Eagles FC players
Australian soccer players
Wollongong United FC players